Rex Lee may refer to:
Rex Lee (actor) (born 1969), Korean-American actor
Rex E. Lee (1935–1996), US Solicitor General under President Reagan and later president of Brigham Young University
H. Rex Lee (1910–2001), two-time Governor of American Samoa and FCC commissioner